Mikko "Mike" Pohjola (born 15 October 1978) is a Finnish poet, playwright, author, and roleplaying game designer. He is the author of Myrskyn aika, Star Wreck Roleplaying Game, Tähti, Kadonneet kyyneleet, Ihmisen poika, and Age of the Tempest.

In Nordic live action role-playing (LARP) circles, he's known as the author of "the Manifesto of the Turku School" (2000), advocating immersive gaming, as the designer of several experimental LARPs, and as the author of several published roleplaying books. Several of Pohjola's artistic and theoretical articles have been published in journals and magazines in Europe and the United States.

Pohjola's first novel, Kadonneet kyyneleet was published in the summer of  2008. Also in 2008, he released the nonfiction book Sanaleikkikirja, a collection of Finnish puns and wordplay.

Roleplaying bibliography

As author
Myrskyn aika, 2003, Johnny Kniga Publishing
Star Wreck Roleplaying Game, 2006, Energia Productions
Tähti, 2007, Riimuahjo Publishing
Age of the Tempest, 2013, Tactic

As contributor
Book of LARP, 2003, Interactivities Ink
As Larp Grows Up, 2003, Projektgruppen KP03
Beyond Role and Play, 2004, Ropecon ry.
Dissecting Larp, 2005

Other books
Kadonneet kyyneleet, 2008, Gummerus Kustannus Oy
Sanaleikkikirja, 2008, Gummerus Kustannus Oy
Ihmisen poika, 2011, Gummerus Kustannus Oy

References

External links
Johnny Kniga Publishing
Gummerus Publishing
Mike Pohjola's website

1978 births
Living people
Role-playing game designers
Live-action role-playing game designers
Left Alliance (Finland) politicians